Punj Lloyd Limited is an Indian Engineering, procurement and construction (EPC) company providing services for energy, infrastructure and defense sectors. The company's operations are spread across the Middle East and Africa, Asia Pacific, South Asia and Europe. The group includes over 50 subsidiaries and has executed many projects in more than 60 countries. The company is headquartered in Gurgaon, Haryana and its stocks are listed on the Bombay Stock Exchange (BSE) and National Stock Exchange (NSE).

History
The foundation of the company was laid by its chairman Atul Punj in 1982 when he started the pipeline division of his family business, Punj Sons Private Limited. He later incorporated it into Punj Lloyd Engineering private limited. The company was rechristened to its current name in 1989.

Subsidiary companies
Major subsidiaries of Punj Lloyd include:
 PLN Construction Ltd, India
 Punj Lloyd Infrastructure Ltd, India
 PL Engineering Ltd, India
 Dayim Punj Lloyd Construction Contracting Co. Ltd., Saudi Arabia
 Khagaria Purnea Highway Project Ltd, India
 PT Punj Lloyd, Indonesia
 Punj Lloyd, Kazakhstan
 Punj Lloyd Pte Ltd, Singapore
 Punj Lloyd Infrastructure Pte. Ltd, Singapore
 Punj Lloyd Oil & Gas Sdn. Bhd., Malaysia
 Punj Lloyd Sdn. Bhd., Malaysia
 Punj Lloyd Building & Infrastructure Pvt. Ltd, Sri Lanka
 Indraprastha Renewables Pvt Ltd, India
 Punj Lloyd Aviation Limited, India
 Dayawanti Punj Model School (CSR), Sitamarhi, Bhadohi, Uttar Pradesh, India 

Other group companies of Punj Lloyd Group are:
 Aero Euro Engineering India Private Ltd, India
 PLE TCI Engenharia Ltda, Brazil
 PT Kekal Adidaya, Indonesia
 Air Works Engineering India Pvt. Ltd., India

References

External links
 Punj Lloyd Group website
 Punj Lloyd on BSE India
 Punj Lloyd IPO Analysis
Rigzone, article 'Punj Lloyd Group bags pipeline service contract for India's Mangla Project', 8 Jan 2009, retrieved 21 Jan 2009
 Punj Lloyd at Alacrastore

Construction and civil engineering companies of India
Companies based in Gurgaon
Construction and civil engineering companies established in 1982
Indian companies established in 1982
1982 establishments in Haryana
Companies listed on the National Stock Exchange of India
Companies listed on the Bombay Stock Exchange